Valsequillo is a municipality in the province of Córdoba, Spain.
According to the 2014 census, the municipality has a population of 385 inhabitants. Its postal code is 14206.

The town is located in the Sierra Morena, at the northern end of Córdoba Province near Extremadura.

History 
The Battle of Valsequillo took place in the area of the town, which was located near the Extremaduran front line between 5 January and 4 February 1939 during the Spanish Civil War.

References

External links 

Municipalities in the Province of Córdoba (Spain)